John Mitchell Merrill (1846 – June 10, 1883) was an American soldier from New York City and a recipient of the Medal of Honor for service during the Indian Wars.

Sergeant Merrill served in the 5th U.S. Cavalry, Company F. At Milk River, Colorado on September 29, 1879, his conduct was exemplary.  He earned special commendation because, although painfully wounded, "he remained on duty and rendered gallant and valuable service."

The Medal of Honor was officially presented in a ceremony on June 7, 1880.

Merrill is buried in Olivet Catholic Cemetery, which is located in Cheyenne, Wyoming.

See also

List of Medal of Honor recipients for the Indian Wars

Notes

External links
 

United States Army Medal of Honor recipients
1846 births
1883 deaths
American military personnel of the Indian Wars
Military personnel from New York City
United States Army soldiers
American Indian Wars recipients of the Medal of Honor